Keaton's Cop is a 1990 American crime film directed by Robert Burge and written by Michael B. Druxman.  It was filmed in the island city of Galveston, Texas. The film stars Lee Majors, Abe Vigoda, Don Rickles, Tracy Brooks Swope, Art LaFleur and June Wilkinson. The film was released on March 9, 1990, by Cannon Film Distributors.

Plot
Ex-mobster Keaton (Abe Vigoda), now living in a retirement home, narrowly misses being the target of a mob hit. Police officers Jake Barber (Don Rickles), who has known Keaton for a long time, and violent Mike Gable (Lee Majors), who takes an immediate disliking to the aging gangster, are called in to investigate a string of murders targeting senior citizens and to protect Keaton. When Barber gets caught in the crossfire of a pair of hit men, Gable and Keaton are forced to get along while they search for the killer.

Cast

 Lee Majors as Mike Gable
 Abe Vigoda as Louis Keaton
 Don Rickles as Jake
 Tracy Brooks Swope as Susan
 Art LaFleur as Detective. Ed Hayes
 June Wilkinson as Sandra Channing / Big Mama
 Robert Hilliard as Lt. Spencer
 Denise Kerwin as Julie
 Talbot Perry Simons as Al 
 George A. Simonelli as Rick Dante
 Fredrica Duke as Marsha Gable
 Clinton Austin Shirley as Jimmy Gable 
 Richard L. Duran as Officer Diaz 
 Robert Foster as Woody Clark
 Nick Gambella as Stan
 Dominic Barto as Hotel Assassin
 Peter Bryson as Fat Tony Monetti
 Ed Geldart as Lennie
 Helen Akerman as Agnes Marx
 Ronald Lee Jones as Ray Channing
 Jeff Jensen as Percy

References

External links
 

1990 films
American crime films
1990 crime films
Golan-Globus films
1990s English-language films
1990s American films
English-language crime films